Gao Yaojie (born 1927) is a Chinese gynecologist, academic, and AIDS activist in Zhengzhou, Henan province, China. Gao has been honored for her work by the United Nations and Western organizations, and had spent time under house arrest. Her split with the Chinese authority on the transmission and the seriousness of the AIDS epidemic in China hinders her further activities and resulted in her leaving for the United States in 2009. She is now living alone in uptown Manhattan, New York City.

Biography
Gao was born in Cao County, Shandong Province in 1927. A retired professor at the Henan College of Traditional Chinese Medicine, Gao is a medical doctor who specialized in ovarian gynecology, and in particular gynecological tumors. She graduated from the School of Medicine at Henan University in 1954. However, because of her intellectual background Dr. Gao was persecuted during the Cultural Revolution, leaving her in ill health. She worked as a gynecologist in the Henan Chinese Medicine Hospital in 1974, was promoted to professor in 1986, and retired in 1990. Dr. Gao was a member of the Henan People's Congress.

Henan was the site of the Bloodhead scandal which resulted in rapid spread of the HIV virus during the 1990s among the impoverished rural population who sold blood at unsanitary Henan provincial and private collection centers where blood was collected from paid blood donors into a central tank, the plasma separated out, and the remainder of the blood pumped back from the central tank into the donors of the same blood type. Gao is well known in China and worldwide for her AIDS prevention work in during the HIV epidemic in Henan, and for advocating much greater attention to people suffering from AIDS and children orphaned by AIDS.

Gao is well known for her writings and visits to Henan villages to educate people on HIV/AIDS prevention and for her work on behalf of the many children orphaned by the AIDS epidemic in Henan Province, home to 100 million people.  In 1996 Gao Yaojie started doing AIDS prevention work and treating people afflicted with AIDS in Henan's villages at her own expense. She visited over 100 Henan villages and treated over 1000 people. She self-published her book Prevention of AIDS and Sexually Transmitted Diseases and distributed 300,000 copies of the book.  Her newsletter Knowledge for HIV Prevention went to 15 issues and a total printing of 530,000 copies.  She used the $20,000 Jonathan Mann Award and $10,000 in contribution to reprint her book.  Since 2000, most of her efforts has been focused on helping "AIDS orphans" ("AIDS orphans" in Chinese refer to healthy children whose parents died of HIV) in Henan's villages.

Life as a gynecologist and experience during the Cultural Revolution

Uncovering the epidemic after retirement

First contact with an AIDS patient 
It was by accident that Gao embarked on the road of anti-AIDS education. On April 7, 1996, a Henan hospital received a woman patient but found it difficult to diagnose her disease. Gao was invited to attend the consultation. At last, the patient, surnamed Ba, was diagnosed with HIV due to a blood transfusion several years earlier. The patient cried and appealed to Gao, saying, "Doctor Gao, how is it that I cannot be cured, for I just took a blood transfusion?"
"I don't want to die!" Ba said. "My husband and my child can't live without me."
Ten days later, the patient died, at the age of 42. Fortunately, neither her husband nor her child was infected by HIV.

It was Gao's first time to see an AIDS patient. Ba's painful expression and heartbreaking cry deeply hurt Gao's heart. As a doctor, she could do nothing but watch the disease take the life of her patient. For several consecutive days, Gao had no appetite and slept poorly. And the worst thing was that patient's blood transfusion came from an infected blood bank, which meant she was the tip of an iceberg that had just emerged from the water and even more lives would be lost if no measures were taken to stem the spread of HIV. In the meantime, Gao also noticed that in the two years from the patient's infection to her death, none of her family was infected, proving the possibility of successful control of the spread of the disease. But the premise is that people should be aware of the urgency in AIDS prevention and grasp prevention knowledge as much as possible.

Commitment to AIDS prevention 

Gao sponsored and edited a tabloid, Knowledge of AIDS Prevention, which has published 530,000 copies in 15 issues. Except for the first issue, all the following issues were funded by Gao herself, costing her 3,000 yuan to 5,000 yuan each. She also bought medicine on her own expenses for patients and sends money to them. In the autumn of 2001, Gao carried out a survey on the knowledge of AIDS prevention. Of the more than 10,000 people surveyed, less than 15 percent had a correct understanding of HIV transmission and AIDS prevention, and most of them were utterly ignorant of HIV transmission through blood.

In order to expand AIDS prevention education, Gao edited the book The Prevention of AIDS / Venereal Disease, which has been published four times for more than 300,000 copies. She spent all her $20,000 in award money from Jonathan Mann Award for Global Health and Human Rights and $10,000 in donations from the Ford Foundation in printing 150,000 copies of the book. Every day, 10 to 100 copies of the book are given free to medical staff, patients, and patients' families in rural areas. After the book's reprinting in August 2001, the Women's Federation of Henan Province, the provincial epidemic prevention station, and the provincial library were presented with some 20,000 copies each and were commissioned to transfer the books to grass-root units and individuals in rural areas. Soon, Gao received piles of letters from different places asking for the book; most of the letters came from Henan Province. Some provinces, including Hainan, Hubei, Guangdong, and Yunnan, and the Xinjiang Uygur Autonomous Region, have used this book as the teaching material for their AIDS education classes.

Yaojie worked alongside Shuping Wang, a health researcher that had previously called out in China's poor practices in blood collection that lead to the spread of hepatitis C in 1993, and who had also been a whistleblower on the rise of HIV infection a few years later. Wang would provide data to help support Yaojie's advocacy messages.

Achievements  
Gao's hard work and persistence, however, have forced the government to admit that there is a problem with AIDS. In 2003, the Chinese government admitted officially that AIDS existed in China and promised funds to prevent and control the disease. In 2004 the United
Nations Theme Group on HIV/AIDS in China released a report estimating that somewhere between 850,000 and 1.5 million adults in China were infected with HIV as of 2001. In 2007, Chinese health officials estimated that only 750,000 adults were infected, but other sources
estimated that the true number was closer to 1.5 million. By October that year, China had officially recorded 183,733 HIV cases, including 12,464 deaths. Up until now, many people at risk remain untested—some are lurking in the shadows because of the stigma—and some
experts fear the actual number could be much higher.

Awards, harassment and publication of autobiography
In 2001, Gao was awarded the Jonathan Mann Award for Health and Human Rights, In 2002, she was named Time Magazine's Asian Heroine. In 2003, she was awarded the Ramon Magsaysay Award for Public Service in Manila, Philippines. In both instances she was denied permission to travel outside China to accept the awards. She was also designated one of the "Ten People Who Touched China in 2003" by China Central Television.

Gao was awarded the "Global Leadership Award, Women Changing Our World" by the Vital Voices Global Partnership along with three other women from China and three women from India, Guatemala, and Sudan at the John F. Kennedy Center for the Performing Arts on March 14, 2007. She was reported in February, 2007 to have been held in house arrest and unable to travel. She had been pressured by local officials to sign a statement that she is "unable to travel due to poor health."  A report on a visit to her apartment while she was still under house arrest by Henan Province Vice Party Secretary Chen Quanguo, Henan Vice Governor Wang Jumei, and Henan Province Communist Party Organization Department head Ye Dongsong presented her flowers and best wishes from the Henan Party and Government for the Chinese New Year  appeared in the Henan Daily and other Chinese media.  On February 16, 2007, bowing to international pressure, the government gave her permission to travel to the United States to receive the award. Gao left China from Guangdong province after receiving a warm company from her supporters. Upon arriving the United States, she stayed briefly with a Chinese family and then moved to New York with a visiting fellowship from Columbia University.

The house arrest of Gao was part of a continuing pattern of harassment, especially in Henan Province, of grassroots AIDS activists in China. In 2006, Wan Yanhai, another prominent activist, was detained and prevented from holding an AIDS conference in Beijing. Gao's blog, which she updated until 2009, had become what Gao called a "battleground" between her supporters and detractors. Gao in her blog entry of February 11 denounced a hacking of her blog and noted that one visitor left a message that people were being paid 50 RMB each to leave negative comments. Gao wrote that the attacks began after she began describing many cases of people continuing to contract HIV through blood transfusions in Henan Province.

On September 20, 2007, New York Academy of Sciences gave her "The Heinz R. Pagels Human Rights of Scientists Award." In 2007, the International Astronomical Union named asteroid No. 38980 after Gao.

In July 2008, Gao's autobiography The Soul of Gao Yaojie (written in Chinese) was published by Ming Pao Publications Limited (Hong Kong), and the English version, The Soul of Gao Yaojie: A Memoir, was published in November 2011.

On February 7, 2015, Gao received the 2014 annual "Liu Binyan Conscience Award". The award ceremony was held at Dr. Gao's New York apartment and more than 10 jury members and guests participated. The award was named after a renewed Chinese doctor Liu Binyan and the jury consisted of well-known Chinese writers.

See also 
 HIV/AIDS in the People's Republic of China
 HIV in Yunnan
Plasma Economy

References

External links 
 "My AIDS Prevention Journey" by Dr. Gao Yaojie
 "Gao Yaojie - A Crusader for AIDS Prevention" from February 4, 2005 PRC periodical China Pictorial
 Gao Yaojie: Physician, Grandmother, and Whistleblower in China’s Fight against HIV/AIDS: Roundtable before the Congressional-Executive Commission on China, One Hundred Eleventh Congress, First Session, December 3, 2009
 Dr. Gao Yaojie - A Hero Fighting Aids in China
 Dr Gao Yaojie's Blog (in Chinese)
 Group Honors Doctor Who Exposed China AIDS Scandal - Nora Boustany includes video interview with Dr. Gao in Chinese.
 Gao Yaojie is Not Sensationalizing the Problem - Yan Lieshan (China Business Herald)
 "Blood Money", an article on Dr. Gao's work by Regan Hoffmann from POZ
 Exiled China Aids activist mourns her former life

1927 births
Living people
HIV/AIDS activists
Chinese bloggers
People from Zhengzhou
HIV/AIDS in China
Chinese gynaecologists
Writers from Heze
Ramon Magsaysay Award winners
People's Republic of China science writers
Physicians from Shandong